Cow Green Reservoir is a  long water reservoir forming part of the border between the historic counties of Westmorland and County Durham in northern England, built between 1967 and 1971 to supply the industries of Teesside.

The reservoir acts as a river regulation reservoir releasing water into the River Tees during dry conditions so that it can be abstracted further downstream. These regulated flows allow six further reservoir levels to be maintained and these in turn provide water for industry and domestic use.

Environmentally, this part of Upper Teesdale is of national importance and the plan to construct this reservoir had been strongly opposed by local conservationists, professional botanists and geologists, including botanist Margaret E. Bradshaw. Their main concern was the protection of the rich flora and fauna of the district and especially rare alpine plants like the unique Teesdale violet. In the end, about a tenth of this plant's habitat was destroyed by the completion of the reservoir. The remaining area was designated the Moor House-Upper Teesdale National Nature Reserve in 1969, from what was previously two separate nature reserves and is England's largest reserve of this type.

The reservoir lies within the North Pennines Area of Outstanding Natural Beauty and European Geopark. The North Pennines was designated as an AONB in 1988 and became Britain's first European Geopark in 2004.

A short distance downstream from the dam is Cauldron Snout waterfall.

Cow Green Reservoir is also the largest reserve of wild brown trout in the North East. Fishing is permitted at the rate of twelve fish per day per person.

References

External links

 Moor House-Upper Teesdale National Nature Reserve

Drinking water reservoirs in England
Reservoirs in County Durham
River regulation in England
RCowGreen
Dufton